The 1999 Texas A&M Aggies football team completed the season with an 8–4 record.  The Aggies had a Big 12 Conference record of 5–3.

Schedule

Roster

Rankings

Game summaries

Louisiana Tech

Tulsa

Southern Miss

Texas Tech

Baylor

Kansas

Oklahoma

Oklahoma State

Nebraska

Missouri

Texas
This rivalry game would unite the two schools for the year, due to the tragic collapse of Texas A&M's bonfire the week prior to the game. A sellout crowd was met with an awe-inspiring halftime performance from both schools.

Penn State

References

Texas AandM
Texas A&M Aggies football seasons
Texas AandM Aggies football